{{DISPLAYTITLE:C19H26N2O}}
The molecular formula C19H26N2O (molar mass: 298.205 g/mol, exact mass: 298.2045 u) may refer to:

 8-Carboxamidocyclazocine (8-CAC)
 LY-293284

Molecular formulas